The City of Subiaco is a local government area in Perth, Western Australia. It was established on 10 April 1896 as the Subiaco Road Board, with a chairman elected by the board members as its leader. The first chairman was Charles Hutt, who was the secretary of the Subiaco Progress Association. By the end of 1896, the population of the Subiaco Road District was above 2000, allowing the Road Board to apply to become a municipality. The government granted the request, and so the Municipality of Subiaco was gazetted on 26 March 1897. The first mayor of the Municipality of Subiaco was Henry Doyle. By 1952, the Municipality of Subiaco had reached a high enough population that it was eligible to become a city. Thus, on 8 February 1952, the City of Subiaco was gazetted.

The longest serving mayor is Joseph Abrahams, who served from 1949 to 1974.

Evelyn Parker, who was mayor from 1975 to 1977, was Western Australia's first woman mayor. She was honoured with the naming of the Evelyn H Parker Library in 1990.

Subiaco Road Board

Municipality of Subiaco

City of Subiaco

References

Bibliography 
 
 
 

Lists of local government leaders in Western Australia
City of Subiaco